"Hot Pants" is a song recorded on February 2, 1971 in Dallas, Texas by Gene Summers & the Platinum Fog. Rush-released in the United States by Charay Records on February 5, 1971, it preceding the release of James Brown's song of the same name by several months. It was reviewed favorably by Cash Box and as a "Personal Pick" by the Gavin Report.

"Hot Pants" was also issued in Australia on the W&G Records label on March 3, 1971.

Reviews 
The Cash Box Newcomer Picks  - February 13, 1971"HOT PANTS" GENE SUMMERS (Charay 100) (1:55) [Softcharay, BMI  - Tarver-Dea Summers-Edwards-Smith] SALVAGE (Odax 420) (2:25) [VanLee-Emily, BMI - Vance, Pockriss] With photo coverage still stunning the national eye, fashion's biggest sensation since the mini gives vent to two novelty sides on "hot pants." These songs capitalize on humor and quick entertainment for one-shot action. Here, both rush productions fuse slow-funk rhythm with bubble gum lyrics to gain maximum teen potential.
THE SUN NEWS - New Releases  - Monday, May 3, 1971 - Page 28  (Melbourne, Australia) A SONG ON HOT PANTSGENE SUMMERS and the Platinum Fog head a week of moderate new releases. Other records come from Booker T. and the MGs, Jacques Deray, the Hollies, Quincey Conserve, Anne Murray, Chairmen of the Board and Barbra Streisand.HIT PICK"HOT PANTS". Gene Summers and the Platinum Fog (W&G). The first of two records on this subject recently, but this one is worthwhile. Great rhythm, but with a limited subject. Flip side: The Young Voices Of Children.

References

Miami New Times - DJ Hottpants: Hott, hott, hott! by John Hood (published December 17, 2008)
Article and sessionography in issue #15  of New Kommotion Magazine 1977 UK
Cash Box Magazine,  (cover pick) February 13, 1971 United States
"Bill Gavin's Personal Picks" (published by The Gavin Report), February 5, 1971 USA
"Newcomer Picks" (published by Cash Box Magazine, New York), February 13, 1971
The Sun News, Monday, May 3, 1971 - Page 28  (Melbourne, Australia)
The Handbook Of Texas Music, Texas State Historical Association  (published at The University Of Texas at Austin) 2005 United States)
Texas Rhythm Texas Rhyme by Larry Willoughby (published by Texas Monthly Press United States 1984)
A Dream Deferred By Matt Weitz, Dallas Observer, July 31-August 6, 1997 Volume 752, pages 73–79 United States
Feature article and sessionography in issue 74 of Rockin' Fifties Magazine 1999 Netherlands

Sources
Gene Summers discography from Rocky Productions, France
Gene Summers discography from Wangdangdula Finland
Gene Summers session data from Tapio's Fin-A-Billy, Finland

See also
Rockin' Country Style  (for sound clips and label shots)

1971 songs
Gene Summers songs
Funk songs
American rhythm and blues songs
Novelty songs
1971 singles
Songs written by Mary Tarver